"The Finale" is the 210th episode of the CBS sitcom Everybody Loves Raymond. It is episode sixteen of season nine, and the final episode of the series. It originally aired on May 16, 2005, and was preceded by an hour-long special looking back on the whole series.

Synopsis
The episode starts with Ray walking into the kitchen having just seen his doctor. He tells Debra that the doctor told him his adenoids have to come out. Debra tells him that it's a routine procedure and Ray is appalled at Debra's lack of concern for his well-being. Marie worriedly comes rushing in and hugs Ray, saying the doctors are "trying to take a piece of my Raymond away." Ray gives Debra a hard time over the course of the next week, fretting about his upcoming surgery and asking questions such as "What if the nurses' top button is undone and the doctor gets distracted?" On the day of the operation, Ray goes into surgery and Debra, Robert, Amy, Frank and Marie wait in the waiting room. Robert laments how the whole world has to stop because Ray is having a routine procedure, and states that the only reason he is there is because Marie dragged him there since he is the same blood type as Raymond. The family tells jokes to lighten the mood, of which Marie disapproves; she says that she needs to go to the bathroom and when she returns everyone should have a sign of concern.

A few moments after Marie leaves, a nurse enters the waiting room and asks for Debra. Debra asks how the procedure went and the nurse, after asking whether Ray had any medical conditions that he did not disclose, states that they are having trouble bringing Ray out of the anesthesia. Debra starts to cry and the rest of the family (minus Marie who is in the bathroom) comes over. Debra tells them what the nurse said and everyone begins to panic. Robert attempts to rush to the operating table, telling the nurse that he and Ray are the same blood type and that he can wake his brother up. Just before he walks through the door, the doctor emerges and says that everything is fine and that it occasionally happens due to hypertension. Everyone is relieved and agrees that they can't tell Ray or Marie about what happened.

Later that evening, Debra brings Ray ice cream in bed. She watches as he starts eating and looks at him lovingly, telling him about what she is planning to do the next day, breaking down when she starts talking about the kids. Ray asks her if it is "that time of the month." Debra begins passionately kissing Ray. Meanwhile, over at Marie's and Frank's, Frank reflects on what happened. Marie notices something is up because he's too silent and he turned down dessert. She finally gets Frank to tell her what happened at the hospital and is hysterical when she finds out that "her son almost died" and nobody told her.

Back across the street, Ray and Debra are still in bed kissing and Marie rushes into their bedroom, jumping on the bed and embracing Raymond. With a central theme of the series being Marie's coddling of Ray, an annoyed Debra says to nobody in particular, "I knew one day this would happen." Ray is mortified that "his worst nightmare is coming true" and asks what is going on. Amy, Robert, and Frank come into the bedroom and Frank tells Ray about what happened at the hospital. Ray is furious that nobody told him, but becomes curious as to how everyone reacted when they thought he might be dead. There is a pause and Ray irritably envisions what he thinks must have been going through Debra's head, saying that while she has to plan a funeral and raise three kids herself, she can finally start dating again. The scene takes on a moment of seriousness when Frank shouts at Raymond that he saw Debra fall apart in the waiting room, telling his son "I've never seen her like that, and I'll tell you, I never want to see her like that again!" Amy says that Robert had to pull the car over on the way home from the hospital because he was crying after "You Are the Sunshine of My Life" came on the radio (though Robert claims he pulled over because he thought he hit a cat). Everyone leaves and Debra and Ray are alone again.

The final scene of the series shows the entire family eating breakfast together after Frank breaks Marie's stove in an attempt to "work on it." Each character seems to emote an amalgam of their signature qualities as they sit and eat together, and with Ray at the center of the table, Debra tells Ray, "It's getting a little crowded in here," to which Ray responds, "Yeah, you know what? We need a bigger table."

Production
Filming of the episode began on January 20, 2005 (Actual film was used for this series).

Cast
Ray Romano as Ray Barone
Patricia Heaton as Debra Barone
Doris Roberts as Marie Barone
Peter Boyle as Frank Barone
Brad Garrett as Robert Barone
Monica Horan as Amy Barone
Madylin Sweeten as Ally Barone
Sullivan Sweeten as Michael Barone
Sawyer Sweeten as Geoffrey Barone

Broadcast 
On the night of its airing, "The Finale" aired after Everybody Loves Raymond: The Last Laugh, an hour-long behind-the-scenes documentary of making the episode; and an episode of Late Show with David Letterman that re-showed Romano's 1995 skit on the show that caused Everybody Loves Raymond to be green-lit. The top price for a 30-second commercial during the U.S. broadcast was approximately $1 million. The episode brought in the largest audience in the show's nine-year run. It brought in 32.94 million viewers, a 20.2 rating and a 29 share, along with an 11.2 rating and a 26 share in the 18-49 demographic, ranking as the most watched program of the week.

Critical reception 
Miriam Di Nunzio of Chicago Sun-Times, awarding "The Finale" three-and-a-half stars, wrote the premise of all the family members loving each other made the episode "emotional and unforgettable." Jeffrey Robinson called it "a great episode with a solid combination of heartwarming material and comedy," also stating no other Raymond episode had the same level of sentimentality.

References

American television series finales
2005 American television episodes
Everybody Loves Raymond episodes